The Elliott 6m class at the 2011 ISAF Sailing World Championships was held in Perth, Western Australia between 3 and 16 December 2011.

Results

Round Robin

Knockout stage

Total results

References

External links

Women's Match Racing World Championship
ISAF
Elliott 6m
2011 in Austrian women's sport